St. Stephen's Cathedral may refer to:

Austria
St. Stephen's Cathedral, Vienna

Australia
Cathedral of St Stephen, Brisbane

Czech Republic
St. Stephen's Cathedral, Litoměřice

France
Agde Cathedral
Auxerre Cathedral
Bourges Cathedral
Châlons Cathedral
Limoges Cathedral
Meaux Cathedral
Metz Cathedral
St. Stephen's Greek Orthodox Cathedral, Paris
Sens Cathedral
Toulouse Cathedral
Toul Cathedral

Germany
St. Stephen's Cathedral, Passau

Hungary
St. Stephen's Basilica, Budapest
Székesfehérvár Basilica

Israel
St. Stephen's Basilica, Jerusalem

Italy
Santo Stefano, Bologna

United States
St. Stephen Cathedral (Phoenix, Arizona)
St. Stephen Cathedral (Owensboro, Kentucky)
St. Stephen's Episcopal Cathedral (Harrisburg, Pennsylvania)
St. Stephen's Episcopal Pro-Cathedral (Wilkes-Barre, Pennsylvania)

See also
St. Stephen's Church (disambiguation)